Song Hak-seong (born 2 July 1979) is a South Korean boxer. He competed in the men's light heavyweight event at the 2004 Summer Olympics.

References

1979 births
Living people
South Korean male boxers
Olympic boxers of South Korea
Boxers at the 2004 Summer Olympics
Place of birth missing (living people)
Asian Games medalists in boxing
Boxers at the 2006 Asian Games
Asian Games silver medalists for South Korea
Medalists at the 2006 Asian Games
Light-heavyweight boxers